Greatest Tank Battles is a military documentary series currently airing on History Television and National Geographic Channel in Canada, where it premiered on 4 January 2010.  The series was subsequently picked up in the United States by the Military Channel, where it premiered on 5 January 2011.  The second season premiered in Canada on 17 January 2011.  The show is also broadcast on Discovery Networks throughout Europe, the Middle East, and Africa. Other countries where the show has signed broadcast deals include India (Fox International Channels) and China (LIC Beijing), with a DVD deal in Australia (Beyond Distribution).

The series is currently available for streaming online for free viewing on Pluto TV, Tubi, YouTube (via the Breakthrough Entertainment channel), Crackle and Freevee.

Presentation
The battles in each episode are illustrated through a combination of 3D CGI reenactments, and when possible includes interviews with participants from both sides of the battle.  Military historians and other experts provide analysis of the tactics employed and the battlefield decisions made.  Detailed statistics on the equipment and vehicles used are also presented, along with background information on the historical circumstances leading to the featured battle, and its aftermath.

Episodes

Season 1

Season 2

Season 3

In other side media

Greatest Tank Battles has been adapted as an iPhone app.

Reception

The Canadian series premiere which aired at 8 pm ET/PT had 348,000 viewers with 178,000 viewers in the A25–54 demographic and 147,000 viewers in the A18–49 category.

See also 

 The History Channel
 Dogfights (TV series)

References

External links
 Official website
 Greatest Tank Battles page at History Television
 Greatest Tank Battles page at Military Channel
 Greatest Tank Battles page at TV Guide.com

2010 Canadian television series debuts
2011 American television series debuts
Documentary television series about war
Documentary television series about World War I
Documentary television series about World War II
Canadian military television series
History (Canadian TV network) original programming
American Heroes Channel original programming
Tank battles
2010s Canadian documentary television series
Television series by Breakthrough Entertainment